Mount Coe is a mountain located in Piscataquis County, Maine, within Baxter State Park, about  northwest of Mount Katahdin.

Mount Coe, ranked 22nd in height among Maine peaks, stands within the watershed of the Penobscot River, which drains into Penobscot Bay. The east side of Mt. Coe drains into a swampy area called "The Klondike", then into Wassataquoik Stream, and the East Branch of the Penobscot River. The northwest and southwest sides of Mt. Coe drain into Nesowdnehunk Stream, then into the West Branch of the Penobscot River.

See also 
 List of mountains in Maine
 New England Hundred Highest

References

New England Hundred Highest
Mountains of Piscataquis County, Maine
Mountains of Maine